Robert F. Titus (born December 6, 1926) was a brigadier general and a career fighter pilot in the United States Air Force. 
Titus flew a combined total of 500 combat missions in Korean War and Vietnam War, and was credited in destroying 3 enemy aircraft in aerial combat during the Vietnam War.

He retired in 1977, after 32 years of distinguished service.

Early life
Titus was born on 1926 in Orange, New Jersey. He attended secondary schools in Maryland and Virginia, and studied mining engineering at Virginia Polytechnic Institute.

Military career
Enlisting in the U.S. Army on January 25, 1945, Titus served with the 82nd Airborne Division in Berlin, Germany, and in the U.S. until he left active duty on August 2, 1946.

After serving two years in the U.S. Army Reserve, Titus enlisted in the Aviation Cadet Program of the U.S. Air Force on September 29, 1948, and was commissioned a second lieutenant. He trained to fly the F-51 Mustang and F-86 Sabre, and later served as a flight instructor for the F-51 and F-86 from September 1950 to August 1951.

Korean War
Titus served as an F-51 and F-86 pilot with the 40th Fighter Interceptor Squadron and 39th Fighter Interceptor Squadron in Korea from September 1951 to September 1952.

On March 3, 1952, he received his first Distinguished Flying Cross when he led a flight of F-51s through dense clouds to the target near Sohui-ri, Korea, where they commenced a series of destructive attacks on enemy mortar positions and bunkers, with Titus personally destroying two heavy mortar positions, two bunkers and an ammunition dump.

Titus flew 101 missions during the war.

Post-war

After his return from Korea, Titus served as a ferry pilot at Dover Air Force Base, Delaware, from 1952 to 1954. He then spent six years as test pilot at Edwards Air Force Base, California, flying the North American F-100 Super Sabre, McDonnell F-101 Voodoo, Convair F-102 Delta Dagger, F-106 Delta Dart, Lockheed F-104 Starfighter, and Republic F-105 Thunderchief. Titus took part in the zero-length-launch tests, in which an F-100 was launched from a truck by a 300,000-pound thrust booster attached to the aircraft. In 1959, he participated in an historic trans-polar flight from United Kingdom to the United States in the F-100 Super Sabre, for which he received a second Distinguished Flying Cross.

Titus completed his master's degree at the University of Chicago on 1961, after receiving an Air Force Institute of Technology assignment to do so. He did a three-year tour flying F-105s in Europe and served in the Headquarters Tactical Air Command at Langley Air Force Base, Virginia, from 1964 to 1966.

Vietnam War

Titus served as commander of the 10th Fighter Commando Squadron at Bien Hoa Air Base, South Vietnam, from May 1966 to January 1967. It was the only F-5 Tiger squadron that the U.S. Air Force ever employed in combat during the war, as part of the combat evaluation for the F-5.

Titus later took command of the 389th Tactical Fighter Squadron at Da Nang Air Force Base flying the F-4 Phantom II. On May 20, 1967, while leading a mission over Yen Bay, North Vietnam, Titus' flight encountered numerous North Vietnamese Air Force MiG-21s. Engaging them in three encounters, Titus shot down 1 MiG-21, while his flight destroyed another MiG-21. For his heroism in the mission, Titus received the Silver Star.

On May 22, Titus and his flight were leading a cover for a strike group of F-105s in operations near Hanoi. During the mission, they encountered two MiG-21s which fired missiles and continued straight past the formation. Titus and his flight chased the MiG-21s, with Titus
shooting down one of the MiG-21s with an AIM-9 Sidewinder. Titus continued to chase the second MiG-21 and engaged in series of rapid maneuvers from 25,000 feet to about 2,000 until they reached the vicinity of Hòa Lạc Air Base, where they encountered enemy flak and surface-to-air missiles. As the MiG-21 rolled wings level and started a high-G pullout at about 1,500 feet, Titus managed to shoot it down with an externally mounted M61 Vulcan in his F-4, thus crediting him with one of the few aerial gun victories during the war. For shooting down two MiG-21s in a single mission, Titus was awarded the Air Force Cross, the second only to the Medal of Honor.

During the war, Titus flew 400 combat missions, and was credited in the destruction of three MiG-21s in aerial combat.

Post-war
In September 1967, Titus was assigned to Headquarters U.S. Air Force, where he was project officer for the F-15 Eagle and chief of Advanced Tactical Systems in the Office of the Deputy Chief of Staff, Research and Development. He entered the National War College in August 1969. In June 1970 he went to MacDill Air Force Base, Florida, as vice commander, 15th Tactical Fighter Wing (redesignated as 1st Tactical Fighter Wing) and later became commander.

In May 1971, Titus was transferred to Okinawa and assumed command of the 18th Tactical Fighter Wing of the Pacific Air Forces at Kadena Air Base and later became commander of the 313th Air Division. He was appointed deputy chief of staff, operations, Air Force Systems Command, with headquarters at Andrews Air Force Base, Maryland, in August 1973.

He then assumed duty as the U.S. deputy chief of staff, LIVE OAK, with headquarters collocated with Supreme Headquarters Allied Powers Europe at Belgium, in September 1974.

Titus' final assignment was as Inspector General for North American Air Defense Command from February 1977 until his retirement from the Air Force on August 1, 1977.

Later life
After his retirement from Air Force, Titus moved to Colorado Springs, Colorado, where he currently resides.

Titus married Marjorie Winkler, on December 19, 1953. She died on July 11, 2006. They had four children and several grandchildren.

In 2007, Titus appeared on an episode of the History Channel series Dogfights. In the episode titled 'Gun Kills of Vietnam' features May 22, 1967 mission, where he shot down two MiG-21s. The episode also featured an appearance by Col. Milan Zimmer (USAF, ret.), who served as Titus' Weapons Systems Officer (WSO) during the mission. The episode was the fifth episode of the second season of the series, which recreated historical air combat campaigns using modern computer graphics.

During the Commemorative Flight of The Last USAF Mustang on April 18, 2015, Titus flew in the rear seat of Darryl Bond's P-51D Mustang “Lady Jo” at Petaluma Municipal Airport.

Awards and decorations
During his lengthy career, Titus earned many decorations, including:

Air Force Cross citation

Titus, Robert F.
Lieutenant Colonel, U.S. Air Force
389th Tactical Fighter Squadron, 366th Tactical Fighter Wing, Da Nang Air Base, South Vietnam
Date of Action: May 22, 1967

Citation:

References

1926 births
Living people
United States Air Force generals
United States Air Force personnel of the Korean War
American Korean War pilots
United States Air Force personnel of the Vietnam War
American Vietnam War pilots
People from Orange, New Jersey
Military personnel from New Jersey
Aviators from New Jersey
Recipients of the Air Force Cross (United States)
Recipients of the Silver Star
Recipients of the Legion of Merit
Recipients of the Distinguished Flying Cross (United States)
Recipients of the Meritorious Service Medal (United States)
Recipients of the Air Medal
University of Chicago alumni
American test pilots
People from Colorado Springs, Colorado
National War College alumni